Prince Bogusław Fryderyk Radziwiłł (3 January 1809 – 2 January 1873) was a Polish nobleman and Prussian military officer and politician. At the time Poland was partitioned, he lived in the Kingdom of Prussia, where he was a member of the Prussian parliament (later, of the Prussian House of Lords). He attained the rank of general within the Prussian Army.

His father, Prince Antoni Henryk Radziwiłł, was also the Duke-Governor of the Grand Duchy of Poznań, an autonomous province of the Kingdom of Prussia. His mother was Princess Louise of Prussia, and through her, he was great-grandson of King Frederick William I of Prussia, great-great-grandson of King George I of Great Britain, cousin of William I, German Emperor and Tsar Alexander II of Russia. He was the father of Edmund Radziwiłł and Ferdynand Radziwiłł.

Radziwiłł was born in Königsberg and died in Berlin.

Ancestry

1809 births
1873 deaths
Lieutenant generals of Prussia
Boguslaw Fryderyk
Nobility from Königsberg
Members of the Prussian House of Lords
Members of the Sejm (Provinziallandtag) of Posen
German people of Polish descent
Polish people of German descent
Politicians from Königsberg